Scavone is a surname. Notable people with the surname include:

Gary Scavone, Canadian academic and musician
Manuel Scavone (born 1987), Italian footballer
Myke Scavone (born 1949), American musician
Oscar Vicente Scavone (born 1955), Paraguayan businessman